Piojo is Spanish for louse. Piojo may also refer to:

Places
Rancho El Piojo, Mexican land-grant in present day California
Isla Piojo, island in the Gulf of California
Piojó, a municipality and town in the Colombian department of Atlántico

People
Los Piojos, Argentine rock band
Miguel Herrera (born 1968), a Mexican former football defender and manager known as Piojo
Claudio López (footballer) (born 1974), Argentine football forward known as Piojo
Piojo (footballer, born 1985), Argentine football striker
Piojo (footballer, born 1989), Spanish football winger